The Anchor Giants were a Negro league baseball team that played in the early years of the 20th century. They were managed by Harry Sellars, and played in the Philadelphia area.

The Anchor Giants played from 1907 to 1911.

References

 

Defunct sports teams in Pennsylvania
Negro league baseball teams
Sports in Philadelphia
Defunct baseball teams in Pennsylvania
Baseball teams disestablished in 1911
Baseball teams established in 1907